The Warren Wilson Beach House, later known as The Venice Beach House is a Craftsman style house built in 1911 in the Venice section of Los Angeles, California.  It has operated over the years as both a residence and a camp.

The Venice Beach House structure was listed on the National Register of Historic Places in 1986.

See also
 California Bungalow
 Venice, Los Angeles, California
 List of Registered Historic Places in Los Angeles

References

External links
Venice Beach House: images website

American Craftsman architecture in California
Houses completed in 1911
Houses on the National Register of Historic Places in Los Angeles
Venice, Los Angeles